Loneliest in the Morning is an album by the Canadian musician Julie Doiron, released in 1997.

Critical reception
The Edmonton Journal called the album "a languid, meandering—but very pretty—acoustic collection."

AllMusic wrote that "the guitar provides the subtle rhythm, while Doiron's voice is captivating and enchanting." Exclaim! thought that although the songs "are little more than Doiron's soft voice and guitar, they're fascinating and delicately beautiful."

Track listing

"So Fast" - 2:09
"Dance Me" - 2:52
"Sorry Part I" - 2:17
"Tell You Again" - 2:23
"Explain" - 2:13
"Crying Baby" - 2:10
"Sweeter" - 1:34
"Tonight, We Sleep" - 3:28
"Mother" - 2:30
"Love to Annoy" - 2:37
"Creative Depression" - 2:27
"Sorry, Part II" - 2:51
"Condescending You" - 2:59
"Le Soleil" - 2:45

References

1997 albums
Julie Doiron albums
Sub Pop albums